is a 2012 Japanese tokusatsu superhero film to commemorate the 30th Anniversary of the Metal Hero Series' first entry, Space Sheriff Gavan, and is a sequel to the Space Sheriff series. Kenji Ohba, Toshiaki Nishizawa, and Shōzō Iizuka reprise their roles from the original television series.

Plot
Fulfilling their fifteen-year-old childhood dream to venture into space, Geki Jumonji and Toya Okuma join SARD and take a mission to Mars with their childhood friend Itsuki Kawai giving them good luck pendants so she can be with them in spirit. However, the two are labelled MIA when their space shuttle (based on the HOPE concept) mysteriously disappears. A year later, while remembering her friends, Itsuki finds the SARD complex being attacked by a murderous monster and runs for her life with her pursuer catching up to her. By then, a silver-armored figure named Space Sheriff Gavan appears and battles the monster as he is revealed to be Zan Vardo of the Space Mafia Makuu. As they fight, Zan Vardo holds Itsuki hostage until he is hit by an attack of an unknown origin, allowing Gavan to seemingly finish him off with his Gavan Dynamic and rescue Itsuki, who recognizes him as Geki as he boards the Dolgran without further explanations. Summoned to Planet Bird, it is revealed that Geki has spent the last year training at the Galactic Union and now works as a provisional Space Sheriff in the Gavan-Type G combat suit. Geki is reprimanded by Commander Qom for failing to protect the data that was taken during the fight by Lizard Doubler with the consideration to have Space Sheriffs Sharivan and Shaider, Kai Hyuga and Shu Karasuma, take over. However, Geki convinces Qom to give him another chance and returns to Earth.

Upon his return, Geki meets with Itsuki and takes her into the Dolgran where she meets his partner Shelly of Planet Bird.  Refusing to tell her the truth about what happened with him and Toya during the mission one year before, Geki's search takes him to Oyama Energy Laboratory where a meteor is being researched. However, Geki finds himself being attacked by the scientists and security as Shelly fails to stop Makuu's Witch Kill from obtaining the meteor which is needed to resurrect Don Horror. Kill takes her leave as Geki and Shelly escape with their lives, with Itsuki finding Toya's pendant among the wreckage. Geki later revealed to Shelly how he ended up drifting in space after his shuttle exploded and Toya sucked into the vortex's event horizon. By that time, after she broke the code with Shelly pinpointing the location, Itsuki has Geki take her to the location. There, she sees an illusion of Toya as she and Geki follow it into a trap set up by Makuu's leader Brighton. Overpowering Geki in his Gavan Type-G, Bright takes Itsuki into Makuu Space while having Kill, Zan Vardo, Lizard Doubler, a group of Crushers deal with the Space Sheriff. Luckily, the original Space Sheriff Gavan arrives to even the odds and get Geki to safety, revealed to have been the one who saved Geki from drifting space and during his fight with Zan Vardo.

Learning from Commander Qom that he has been relieved of duty, Geki finds himself being attacked by Gavan as he ends the youth's indecision as only he can stop the rebirth of Don Horror. The two then find themselves attacked by Lizard Doubler, with Geki saving Shelly before the Doubler sends the two into Makuu Space where he becomes three-times as powerful. After successfully escaping Makuu Space, the two Gavans don their combat suits and Gavan stays behind to destroy Lizard Doubler so Gavan Type-G can proceed to space, destroying an entire fleet of Makuu ships with the Electronic Starbeast Dol before reaching what remained of Makuu Castle. With Sharivan and Shaider holding off Witch Kill and Zan Vardo, Gavan Type-G finally reaches Itsuki and Brighton, revealed to be Toya.

Revealing that he pledged himself to Don Horror while trapped in another dimension, Toya intends to kill Geki for not saving him while offering Itsuki's body to Don Horror so he can possess her and engulf the entire universe in Makuu Space. With no option left, with Itsuki trying to fight out of the possession, Gavan Type-G mortally wounds Brighton with a Gavan Dynamic to end the ritual. With Makuu Castle beginning to self-destruct, Geki manages to save Toya from falling into the abyss as they and Itsuki escape on Dol. Back on Earth, an agonizing Toya finally reconciles with Geki and Itsuki before passing away to his friends' dismay. Shelly later informs that in recognition to his efforts, the Galactic Union Patrol officially establishes Geki as the new Gavan. Geki then departs from Earth with Shelly, leaving behind a letter to Itsuki, where he states that he will return to meet her again once he accomplishes his duty as a Space Sheriff.

Characters
 
As the new Gavan, Geki battled the revived Space Mafia Makuu and defeated its masked leader Brighton who originally his best friend Toya Okuma. Soon after, Geki is redeployed to Earth to pursue Rhino Doubler, getting the Go-Busters' aid in defeating one of Makuu's remaining agents.
 is Commander Qom's niece and Geki's assistant from Planet Bird, owning a visual illusion device allows her to use "Laser Vision," transforming into a budgerigar. While separated from Geki, Shelly meets the Go-Busters and becomes friends with Yoko.
 is a member of the Galactic Union Police who succeeded its veteran member Den Iga as the current , shouting  whenever he needs the spaceship  he is based on to encase him in Solar Metal particles that form into his combat suit within milliseconds. As Geki's senior, Kai aided against the revived Space Mafia Makuu and later aids him, Yellow Buster, and the other super heroes during the events of Kamen Rider × Super Sentai × Space Sheriff: Super Hero Taisen Z.
 is a member of the Galactic Union Police who succeeded its veteran member Dai Sawamura as the current , shouting  whenever he needs the spaceship  he is based on to bathe with Plasma Blue Energy emitted from the Vavilos to form his armor within milliseconds. He later aids the super heroes during the events of Kamen Rider × Super Sentai × Space Sheriff: Super Hero Taisen Z.

V-Cinema

Next Generation
 is a set of two V-Cinema releases that focus on side stories of Kai Hyuga as the current Space Sheriff Sharivan and Shu Karasuma as the current Space Sheriff Shaider.

Space Squad

In 2016, it was announced on Toei's press release that a crossover between Gavan and Tokusou Sentai Dekaranger, titled  is set to be released in 2017.

Cast
: 
: 
: 
: 
: 
: 
: 
: 
: 
Young Geki: 
Young Toya: 
Young Itsuki: 
: 
: 
: 
: 
: 
Narration:

Theme songs
Main film theme

Lyrics: 
Composition: 
Arrangement: 
Artist: Akira Kushida
Insert song

Lyrics: Keisuke Yamakawa
Composition: Michiaki Watanabe
Arrangement: 
Artist: Akira Kushida
An updated version of the original series theme. The song was also played in episode 31 of Tokumei Sentai Go-Busters.

See also
Space Sheriff Gavan
Kaizoku Sentai Gokaiger vs. Space Sheriff Gavan: The Movie
Space Sheriff Sharivan
Space Sheriff Shaider
Tokumei Sentai Go-Busters
Metal Hero Series

References

External links
 

Films directed by Osamu Kaneda
Toei tokusatsu films
2010s science fiction films
Metal Hero films
2012 films
2010s Japanese superhero films
Films scored by Kousuke Yamashita